The following species in the flowering plant genus Stachys are accepted by Plants of the World Online. The genus is probably paraphyletic.

Stachys acerosa 
Stachys aculeolata 
Stachys adulterina 
Stachys aegyptiaca 
Stachys aethiopica 
Stachys affinis 
Stachys agraria 
Stachys ajugoides 
Stachys alabamica 
Stachys albanica 
Stachys albens 
Stachys albicaulis 
Stachys albiflora 
Stachys albotomentosa 
Stachys aleurites 
Stachys alpigena 
Stachys alpina 
Stachys amanica 
Stachys × ambigua 
Stachys anamurensis 
Stachys andongensis 
Stachys angustifolia 
Stachys anisochila 
Stachys annua 
Stachys antalyensis 
Stachys aperta 
Stachys appalachiana 
Stachys arabica 
Stachys arachnoidea 
Stachys araucana 
Stachys arenaria 
Stachys arenariiformis 
Stachys argillicola 
Stachys aristata 
Stachys arrecta 
Stachys arriagana 
Stachys arvensis 
Stachys aspera 
Stachys asperata 
Stachys atherocalyx 
Stachys aucheri 
Stachys aurea 
Stachys babunensis 
Stachys bakeri 
Stachys balansae 
Stachys balensis 
Stachys bayburtensis 
Stachys baytopiorum 
Stachys beckeana 
Stachys benthamiana 
Stachys bergii 
Stachys biflora 
Stachys bigelovii 
Stachys bithynica 
Stachys bizensis 
Stachys × bodeana 
Stachys bogotensis 
Stachys bolusii 
Stachys bombycina 
Stachys boraginoides 
Stachys brachiata 
Stachys brachyclada 
Stachys bridgesii 
Stachys bullata 
Stachys burchelliana 
Stachys burgsdorffioides 
Stachys × burrii 
Stachys buttleri 
Stachys byzantina 
Stachys caffra 
Stachys calcicola 
Stachys candida 
Stachys canescens 
Stachys carduchorum 
Stachys caroliniana 
Stachys cataonica 
Stachys chamissonis 
Stachys chasmosericea 
Stachys chinensis 
Stachys choruhensis 
Stachys chrysantha 
Stachys circinata 
Stachys citrina 
Stachys clingmanii 
Stachys coccinea 
Stachys collina 
Stachys comosa 
Stachys cordata 
Stachys cordifolia 
Stachys corsica 
Stachys costaricensis 
Stachys cretica 
Stachys × cryptadenia 
Stachys cuneata 
Stachys cydni 
Stachys cymbalaria 
Stachys darcyana 
Stachys debilis 
Stachys didymantha 
Stachys × digenea 
Stachys dinteri 
Stachys distans 
Stachys diversifolia 
Stachys dregeana 
Stachys drummondii 
Stachys durandiana 
Stachys duriaei 
Stachys ehrenbergii 
Stachys elliptica 
Stachys eplingii 
Stachys erectiuscula 
Stachys eremicola 
Stachys eriantha 
Stachys euadenia 
Stachys euboica 
Stachys fendleri 
Stachys filifolia 
Stachys flavescens 
Stachys flexuosa 
Stachys floccosa 
Stachys floridana 
Stachys fominii 
Stachys fontqueri 
Stachys forsythii 
Stachys fragillima 
Stachys fruticulosa 
Stachys geobombycis 
Stachys germanica 
Stachys gilliesii 
Stachys glandulibracteata 
Stachys glandulifera 
Stachys glandulosa 
Stachys glandulosissima 
Stachys globosa 
Stachys glutinosa 
Stachys gossweileri 
Stachys goulimyi 
Stachys graciliflora 
Stachys graeca 
Stachys grandidentata 
Stachys grandifolia 
Stachys graveolens 
Stachys guyoniana 
Stachys hakkariensis 
Stachys hamata 
Stachys harkerae 
Stachys harleyana 
Stachys hebens 
Stachys heraclea 
Stachys herrerae 
Stachys herrerana 
Stachys hians 
Stachys hildebrandtii 
Stachys hintoniorum 
Stachys hispida 
Stachys hissarica 
Stachys huber-morathii 
Stachys huetii 
Stachys huillensis 
Stachys humbertii 
Stachys humifusa 
Stachys hydrophila 
Stachys hyssopifolia 
Stachys hyssopoides 
Stachys iberica 
Stachys iltisii 
Stachys inanis 
Stachys inflata 
Stachys intermedia 
Stachys ionica 
Stachys iraqensis 
Stachys iva 
Stachys jaimehintonii 
Stachys jijigaensis 
Stachys keerlii 
Stachys kermanshahensis 
Stachys ketenoglui 
Stachys komarovii 
Stachys kotschyi 
Stachys kouyangensis 
Stachys kulalensis 
Stachys kuntzei 
Stachys kurdica 
Stachys lamarckii 
Stachys lamioides 
Stachys langmaniae 
Stachys lanigera 
Stachys latidens 
Stachys lavandulifolia 
Stachys laxa 
Stachys leucoglossa 
Stachys × leucomalla 
Stachys libanotica 
Stachys lindenii 
Stachys linearis 
Stachys longiflora 
Stachys longispicata 
Stachys lurestanica 
Stachys lyallii 
Stachys macraei 
Stachys macrotricha 
Stachys manantlanensis 
Stachys mandoniana 
Stachys marashica 
Stachys mardinensis 
Stachys maritima 
Stachys marrubiifolia 
Stachys matthewsii 
Stachys × medebachensis 
Stachys megalodonta 
Stachys melampyroides 
Stachys menthifolia 
Stachys menthoides 
Stachys mexicana 
Stachys mialhesii 
Stachys milanii 
Stachys minor 
Stachys × mirabilis 
Stachys mohinora 
Stachys mollissima 
Stachys moorei 
Stachys mouretii 
Stachys mucronata 
Stachys multicaulis 
Stachys munzurdagensis 
Stachys namazdaghensis 
Stachys natalensis 
Stachys nelsonii 
Stachys nemorivaga 
Stachys nepetifolia 
Stachys nephrophylla 
Stachys neurocalycina 
Stachys nigricans 
Stachys nivea 
Stachys nubilorum 
Stachys obliqua 
Stachys oblongifolia 
Stachys obscura 
Stachys obtusicrena 
Stachys obtusifolia 
Stachys ochroleuca 
Stachys ocymastrum 
Stachys oligantha 
Stachys oreophila 
Stachys palaestina 
Stachys palustris 
Stachys paneiana 
Stachys pannosa 
Stachys parolinii 
Stachys pauli 
Stachys penanevada 
Stachys peruviana 
Stachys petrokosmos 
Stachys philippiana 
Stachys pilifera 
Stachys pilosa 
Stachys pilosissima 
Stachys pinardii 
Stachys pinetorum 
Stachys pittieri 
Stachys plumosa 
Stachys pringlei 
Stachys pseudohumifusa 
Stachys pseudonigricans 
Stachys pseudophlomis 
Stachys pseudopinardii 
Stachys pumila 
Stachys pusilla 
Stachys pycnantha 
Stachys pyramidalis 
Stachys radicans 
Stachys ramosissima 
Stachys recta 
Stachys rehmannii 
Stachys reptans 
Stachys reticulata 
Stachys riederi 
Stachys rigida 
Stachys riparia 
Stachys rivularis 
Stachys rizeensis 
Stachys rosea 
Stachys rothrockii 
Stachys rotundifolia 
Stachys rubella 
Stachys rudatisii 
Stachys rugosa 
Stachys rupestris 
Stachys salisii 
Stachys sanchezii 
Stachys sandersii 
Stachys saturejoides 
Stachys saxicola 
Stachys scaberula 
Stachys scabrida 
Stachys schimperi 
Stachys serbica 
Stachys sericantha 
Stachys sericea 
Stachys sericophylla 
Stachys sessilifolia 
Stachys sessilis 
Stachys setifera 
Stachys simplex 
Stachys sintenisii 
Stachys sivasica 
Stachys sparsipilosa 
Stachys spathulata 
Stachys spectabilis 
Stachys speluncarum 
Stachys sphaerodonta 
Stachys spinosa 
Stachys spinulosa 
Stachys splendens 
Stachys spreitzenhoferi 
Stachys sprucei 
Stachys spruneri 
Stachys stebbinsii 
Stachys stricta 
Stachys strictiflora 
Stachys subaphylla 
Stachys sublobata 
Stachys subnuda 
Stachys swainsonii 
Stachys sylvatica 
Stachys taliensis 
Stachys talyschensis 
Stachys tamaulipana 
Stachys tenerrima 
Stachys tenuifolia 
Stachys tetragona 
Stachys thirkei 
Stachys thracica 
Stachys thunbergii 
Stachys tlaxiacana 
Stachys tmolea 
Stachys torresii 
Stachys tournefortii 
Stachys trichophylla 
Stachys trinervis 
Stachys truncata 
Stachys tubulosa 
Stachys tundjeliensis 
Stachys turcomanica 
Stachys turkestanica 
Stachys turneri 
Stachys tymphaea 
Stachys tysonii 
Stachys uniflora 
Stachys urticoides 
Stachys venezuelana 
Stachys venulosa 
Stachys veroniciformis 
Stachys virgata 
Stachys viscosa 
Stachys viticina 
Stachys vulnerabilis 
Stachys vuralii 
Stachys willemsei 
Stachys woronowii 
Stachys xanthantha 
Stachys yemenensis 
Stachys yildirimlii 
Stachys zepcensis 
Stachys zeyheri 
Stachys zoharyana

References

Stachys